Night Nurse (26 May 1971 – 1998) was an Irish-bred English-trained National Hunt racehorse. Night Nurse garnered 35 wins, winning a total of £174,507 viz. He won 3 races on the flat at 3 and 4-years old and placed 3 times; he also won 32 National Hunt races, 19 wins over hurdles and 13 wins in steeplechases from 64 starts. He was awarded the highest Timeform rating ever given to a hurdler and has been acclaimed amongst the greatest ever hurdlers.

Background
Night Nurse was a bay gelding bred at the Cloghran Stud in Ireland by Eleanor Samuelson, the daughter of Dick Dawson. He was sired by Falcon out of Samuelson's mare Florence Nightingale. At the Newmarket Houghton sale in 1972 Night Nurse was sold for 1,300 guineas to the trainer Peter Easterby. During his racing career he was owned by Reg Spencer and trained by Easterby at his stables at Habton Grange near Malton, North Yorkshire. Night Nurse was ridden in many of his early races by the Irishman Paddy Broderick, who used a long-rein style.

Racing career

Flat racing
Night Nurse failed to win in six races as a two-year-old in 1973 and won once, in a maiden race at Ripon Racecourse, from six attempts in the following year. He won two of his three races in 1975 and finished second in his only flat race of 1976.

Hurdle racing
He won 10 consecutive hurdle races from 1975–76 which included an undefeated season where he won the Welsh, English and Scottish Champion hurdles.

Night Nurse's second victory in the Champion Hurdle is widely regarded as the highest-quality race ever run over hurdles. His Peter Easterby-trained stablemate Sea Pigeon, a future dual winner, was fourth, with the great Monksfield beaten by two lengths into second. A last-flight mistake contributed to the runner-up's defeat, and the pair's rematch at Aintree shortly after in the Templegate Hurdle is still talked about. It was jump racing's most famous ever dead-heat.

Steeplechasing
Night Nurse was successfully switched to chasing and was several times fancied to win the Cheltenham Gold Cup, but the closest he came was second to Little Owl in 1981.

Assessment
Timeform rated Night Nurse at 182, the highest rating ever awarded to a hurdler.

Pedigree

Night Nurse was inbred 4 × 4 to Fair Trial, meaning that this stallion appears twice in the fourth generation of his pedigree.

References

1971 racehorse births
1998 racehorse deaths
Cheltenham Festival winners
Racehorses bred in the United Kingdom
Racehorses trained in the United Kingdom
National Hunt racehorses
Thoroughbred family 3-e
Byerley Turk sire line
Champion Hurdle winners